God's Clay is a 1928 British silent drama film directed by Graham Cutts and starring Anny Ondra, Trilby Clark, Haddon Mason and Franklyn Bellamy. It is an adaptation of the novel God's Clay by Claude Askew and Alice Askew. It had previously been made into a 1919 film of the same name. The film was made at Elstree Studios by the British subsidiary of the First National Pictures.

Plot
A respectable woman's position in society is threatened by a blackmailer.

Cast
 Anny Ondra as Angela Clifford
 Trilby Clark as Poppy Stone
 Franklyn Bellamy as Jaspar Murgatroyd
 Haddon Mason as Geoffrey Vance
 Marie Ault as Hannah
 Julian Royce as Duke
 Bernard Vaughan as Butler
 Antoinette Brough as Mary Robbins
 Annie Esmond as Minor role

References

Bibliography
 Low, Rachel. The History of British Film: Volume IV, 1918–1929. Routledge, 1997.

External links

1928 films
1928 drama films
British silent feature films
British drama films
Films directed by Graham Cutts
Films based on British novels
Films set in London
Films set in Cornwall
Films shot at British International Pictures Studios
Remakes of British films
British black-and-white films
1920s English-language films
1920s British films
Silent drama films